Crash is a 2004 American drama film produced, directed, and co-written by Paul Haggis. The film features racial and social tensions in Los Angeles. A self-described "passion piece" for Haggis, Crash was inspired by a real-life incident in which his Porsche was carjacked in 1991 outside a video store on Wilshire Boulevard. The film features an ensemble cast, including Sandra Bullock, Don Cheadle, Matt Dillon, Jennifer Esposito, William Fichtner,  Brendan Fraser, Terrence Howard, Chris "Ludacris" Bridges, Thandiwe Newton, Michael Peña, and Ryan Phillippe.

Crash first premiered at the 2004 Toronto International Film Festival on September 10, 2004 before it was released in theaters on May 6, 2005. The film was commercial success, grossing $98.4 million worldwide at the box office against its $6.5 million budget.

The film received several award and nominations, and was named one of the top ten films of the year by both the American Film Institute and the National Board of Review. Crash received six Academy Award nominations and won three, for Best Picture, Best Original Screenplay, and Best Film Editing, at the 78th Academy Awards. It was also nominated for nine British Academy Film Awards and won two, for Best Original Screenplay and Best Supporting Actress for Newton. Dillon received nominations for best supporting actor at the Academy Awards, British Academy Film Awards, Golden Globe Awards, and Screen Actors Guild Awards for his performance. Additionally, the cast won the Screen Actors Guild Award for Outstanding Performance by a Cast in a Motion Picture, and Harris and Robert Moresco won the Writers Guild of America Award for Best Original Screenplay.

Accolades

References

External links
 

Lists of accolades by film